White-shoe firm is an American term used to describe prestigious professional services firms that have traditionally been associated with the upper-class elite who graduated from Ivy League colleges. The term is most often used to describe leading old-line law firms and Wall Street financial institutions, as well as accounting firms that are over a century old, typically in New York City and Boston. 

Former Wall Street attorney John Oller, author of White Shoe, credits Paul Drennan Cravath with creating the distinct model adopted by virtually all white-shoe law firms, the Cravath System, just after the turn of the 20th century, about 50 years before the phrase white-shoe firm came into use.

Etymology
The phrase derives from "white bucks", laced suede or buckskin (or Nubuck) derby shoes, usually with a red sole, long popular among the student body of Ivy League colleges. A 1953 Esquire article, describing social strata at Yale University, explained that "White Shoe applies primarily to the socially ambitious and the socially smug types who affect a good deal of worldly sophistication, run, ride and drink in rather small cliques, and look in on the second halves of football games when the weather is good." The Oxford English Dictionary cites the phrase "white-shoe college boys" in the J.D. Salinger novel Franny and Zooey (1957) as the first use of the term: "Phooey, I say, on all white-shoe college boys who edit their campus literary magazines. Give me an honest con man any day." It also appears in a 1958 Fortune article by Spencer Klaw, which describes some firms as having "a predilection for young men who are listed in the Social Register. These firms are called 'white-shoe outfits', a term derived from the buckskin shoes that used to be part of the accepted uniform at certain eastern prep schools and colleges."

Usage
The term originated in the Ivy League colleges and originally reflected a stereotype of old-line firms populated by White Anglo-Saxon Protestants (WASPs). The term historically had antisemitic connotations, as many of the New York firms known as white-shoe were considered inaccessible to Jewish lawyers until the 1960s. The phrase has since lost some of this connotation, but is still defined by Princeton University's WordNet as "denoting a company or law firm owned and run by members of the WASP elite who are generally conservative". Most white-shoe firms also excluded Roman Catholics. A 2010 column in The Economist described the term as synonymous with "big, old, east-coast and fairly traditional." In the 21st century, the term is sometimes used in a general sense to refer to firms that are perceived as prestigious or high-quality; it is also sometimes used in a derogatory manner to denote stodginess, elitism, or a lack of diversity.

Examples
The following U.S. firms are often referred to as being white-shoe firms:

Accountancy
The current Big Four accounting firms and the former Big Eight auditors from which they merged:
 Deloitte (merged from Deloitte Haskins & Sells and Touche Ross)
 Ernst & Young (merged from Ernst & Whinney and Arthur Young)
 KPMG (formerly Peat Marwick Mitchell)
 PricewaterhouseCoopers (merged from Price Waterhouse and Coopers & Lybrand)
The only former Big Eight firm not merged into one of the Big Four was Arthur Andersen, which went out of business in 2002 after the Enron scandal.

Banking
Traditional
 Brown Brothers Harriman & Co.
 Dillon, Read & Co. (acquired by UBS in 1998)
 First Boston (acquired by Credit Suisse in 1990)
 Kuhn, Loeb & Co. (merged with Lehman Brothers in 1977)
 J.P. Morgan & Co. (merged with Chase Manhattan in 1996, and became JPMorgan Chase in 2000)
 Morgan Stanley
 White Weld & Co. (acquired by Merrill Lynch in 1978)

Modern
 Barclays
 Goldman Sachs
 Morgan Stanley
 JPMorgan Chase
 Lazard Frères & Co.
 UBS

Management Consultancies
The Big Three (management consultancies), colloquially known as ‘’‘MBB’’’, consisting of the largest management consulting firms by revenue: 

McKinsey & Company
Bain & Company
Boston Consulting Group

Law

Traditional
 Arnold & Porter
 Cadwalader, Wickersham & Taft
 Covington & Burling
 Cravath, Swaine & Moore
 Davis Polk & Wardwell
 Debevoise & Plimpton
 Goodwin Procter
 Hogan & Hartson merged with Lovells LLP into Hogan Lovells
Mayer Brown
Milbank, Tweed, Hadley & McCloy
 Ropes & Gray
 Shearman & Sterling
 Sidley Austin
 Simpson Thacher & Bartlett
 Sullivan & Cromwell
 White & Case
 Willkie Farr & Gallagher
 WilmerHale

Modern
While the term "white-shoe" historically applied only to those law firms populated by WASPs, usage of the term has since been expanded to other top-rated prestigious firms. Many of these firms were founded as a direct result of the exclusionary tendencies of the original white-shoe firms, which provided limited opportunities for Jewish and Catholic lawyers, as well as other non-WASPs, and include:

 Cahill Gordon & Reindel
 Cleary, Gottlieb, Steen & Hamilton
 Fried, Frank, Harris, Shriver & Jacobson
 Greenberg Traurig
 Jones Day
 King & Spalding
Kramer Levin Naftalis & Frankel
 O'Melveny & Myers
Paul, Weiss, Rifkind, Wharton & Garrison
 Proskauer Rose
 Quinn Emanuel Urquhart & Sullivan
 Reed Smith
 Steptoe & Johnson
 Skadden, Arps, Slate, Meagher & Flom
 Squire Patton Boggs
 Wachtell, Lipton, Rosen & Katz
 Weil, Gotshal & Manges

Equivalent law firms outside the United States
 Australia Big Six. In 2012, three of these firms merged with overseas firms, and one other began operating in association with an overseas firm. As a consequence, it has proposed that the term is no longer applicable to the Australian legal profession, displaced by the concept of Global Elite law firms or International Business law firms.: : Brazil: Pinheiro Neto Advogados: Mattos Filho Advogados : Machado Meyer Advogados: Tozzini Freire Advogados: Veirano Advogados
 Canada (Toronto) Seven Sisters
 China (People's Republic) Red Circle, coined by The Lawyer magazine in 2014.
 Japan Big Four
 New Zealand Big Three
 Singapore  Big Four comprising Allen & Gledhill, Drew & Napier, Rajah & Tann, and Wong Partnership
 South Africa Big Five
 United Kingdom (centered on the City of London) 
 Magic Circle, firms with the largest revenues, the most international work and which generally outperform the rest of the London market on profitability.
 Silver Circle, the next tier below the Magic Circle (there is no Golden Circle) has firms smaller than those in the Magic Circle, though sometimes with similar level of profits per equity partner (PEP) and average revenue per lawyer.   
Offshore financial centers Offshore magic circle

References

Further reading
 Wald, Eli, "The rise and fall of the WASP and Jewish law firms." Stanford Law Review 60 (2007): 1803-1866  online

External links
 
 

Law firms of the United States
Legal history